The Crazy Marriage of Laló (German:Die tolle Heirat von Laló) is a 1918 German silent film directed by Lupu Pick.

Cast
In alphabetical order
 Bernd Aldor 
 Alfred Beierle 
 Erra Bognar 
 Franz Groß 
 Rudolf Hofbauer 
 Agda Nilsson 
 Ernst Pittschau 
 Bertold Reissig

References

Bibliography
 Jill Nelmes & Jule Selbo. Women Screenwriters: An International Guide. Palgrave Macmillan, 2015.

External links

1918 films
Films directed by Lupu Pick
German silent feature films
Films of the German Empire
German black-and-white films
1910s German films